Life of the Party is a 2005 film with Eion Bailey and Ellen Pompeo. It was written and directed by Barra Grant.

Synopsis
Michael Elgin, former high school track star, now in his thirties, is floundering. He keeps life's realities at bay by having too many cocktails a few nights too often. One night, he crashes into a tree, emerges unscathed but catalyzes those who care into organizing an intervention. Michael comes home to find the group waiting: his friends, co-workers, parents, his wife, his new girlfriend. The group is nervous. The psychiatrist who was supposed to guide them is stuck in town with a suicidal patient. True to form, Michael takes over, and turns the event into yet another party. All the invitees start drinking themselves and the event spirals out of control. Secrets are revealed, emotions erupt, relationships disintegrate and Michael's life comes crashing down around him. In the aftermath, as he tries to pick up the pieces, Michael finally hits bottom, and is forced to face his demons.

Cast 
 Eion Bailey as Michael Elgin
 Ellen Pompeo as Phoebe Elgin
 Clifton Collins, Jr. as Kipp
 John Ales as Artie
 Gabriel Olds as Stuart
 Kristin Bauer van Straten as Caroline
 Pamela Reed as Evelyn
 David Clennon as Jack
 John Ross Bowie as Bert
 Rosalind Chao as Mei Lin
 Larry Miller as Dr. Trent

Reception

Accolades

References

External links 
 
 
 

Films set in New York City
2005 comedy-drama films
2005 television films
2005 films
Lifetime (TV network) films
Films about alcoholism
American comedy-drama films
Films with screenplays by Barra Grant
Films directed by Barra Grant
American drama television films
2000s English-language films
2000s American films